Clare Mary O'Leary (born 2 June 1967) is an Irish former cricketer who played as a right-handed batter. She appeared in one Test match and 37 One Day Internationals for Ireland between 1996 and 2003.

References

External links
 
 

1967 births
Living people
Cricketers from Dublin (city)
Irish women cricketers
Ireland women One Day International cricketers
Ireland women Test cricketers